James Mulgrew (born 17 October 1945), known professionally as Jimmy Cricket, is an Irish comedian. He first came to prominence as a comedian in the 1970s and has had his own shows on television and radio.

Early life and career
Cricket was born in Cookstown, County Tyrone, Northern Ireland
and left school at 16. He spent the next two years working in a betting shop, before spending the summer of 1966 working as a Red Coat in Butlins Holiday camp at Mosney, County Meath, Republic of Ireland. He spent the following two summers at the Butlins Holiday Camp in Clacton, Essex. By the early 1970s he was living in Manchester. From 1972 he worked at the Pontins holiday camps in Southport and Morecambe. He returned to Clacton-on-Sea in 2006 to star in the eight-week summer show, Summer Special at the West Cliff Theatre.

Jimmy has toured in the UK with other artists such as The Osmonds, Brotherhood of Man, Gerry and the Pacemakers. He has also toured in comedy themed shows with Cannon and Ball, Paul Daniels, Frank Carson and The Krankies. In 2022 he toured with Leah Bell in the, "Right Royal Knees Up Show" for the Queen's Platinum Jubilee.

Television and radio
He was given his own four television series on a show called And There's More (named after his best-known catchphrase), produced by Central Television (also notable for including the first TV appearance by Rory Bremner) and Brian Conley. He also had his own radio series for BBC Radio 2 called Jimmy's Cricket Team, written by Eddie Braben and starring Peter Goodwright, Bill Pertwee and Noreen Kershaw.

He featured in The Krankies Klub alongside the Krankies and Bobby Davro. He has appeared in numerous Royal Variety Shows. He has featured  on numerous occasions the BBC TVs long running TV show The Good Old Days

Jimmy appeared on Bullseye in 1984, scoring 125 with nine darts for charity. He told Tony at the oche he forgot to add 60; Tony said he forgot and added the 60 to give a total of 185.

Jimmy was the subject of This Is Your Life in 1987 when he was surprised by Eamonn Andrews in central London - the last regular edition of the programme to be broadcast with Andrews as presenter.

Cricket was one of a number of performers to appear in the video for the 2007 Comic Relief single, a cover of The Proclaimers' song "I'm Gonna Be (500 Miles)" by Matt Lucas as Andy Pipkin and Peter Kay as Brian Potter.

Style
Cricket's humour is entirely clean. A popular theme of his comedy is Irish logic, and the ubiquitous letter from his "Mammy". He almost always appears in his trademark outfit of cut-off evening trousers, evening tailcoat, hat (given to him by the BBC to wear on The Good Old DayS and wellington boots marked "L" and "R" for left and right, but worn on the wrong feet.  He frequently prefaces an anecdote with the catchphrase:  "Ladies and gentlemen, [beat], come here [or c'mere]".

Personal life
Cricket lives in Lancashire with his wife, May. He has four children and four grandchildren, Tristan, Lorelai, Jim and Bill. Two of his children, Frankie and Katie Mulgrew, followed him into comedy; Katie using her own name, Frankie as 'Frankie Doodle'. Frankie has since become ordained as a Catholic priest and published his first book, Does God LOL?, in June 2013 and his second, Miracles Of Grace in 2020. Another of Cricket's daughters, Jamie, became a Headteacher and now lives in Florida, USA. His oldest son Dale is an events organiser for Bury Hospice.

Papal knighthood
On 18 September 2015 it was announced that he had been awarded a papal knighthood (Order of St. Gregory the Great) by Pope Francis for his charity work.

References

External links
Official website
Biography

Male comedians from Northern Ireland
People from Cookstown
People from Rochdale
Living people
Male television actors from Northern Ireland
1945 births
Butlins Redcoats
Television writers from Northern Ireland
20th-century comedians from Northern Ireland
21st-century comedians from Northern Ireland
British male television writers